The Pual River (also rendered Poal, Pua, Po, and formerly Neumayer, Neumeyer, Nemayer) is a river in northern Papua New Guinea.

See also
List of rivers of Papua New Guinea
Poal River languages

References

Rivers of Papua New Guinea